The 2012 California Golden Bears softball team is the representative of the University of California in the 2012 NCAA Division I softball season.  The team plays their home games in Levine-Fricke Field and they entered the 2012 season after making the Women's College World Series with a 45–13 record in 2011 and making the postseason  for 27 straight years.

Regular season

The 2012 season began for the Golden Bears with extremely high expectations with head coach Diane Ninemire going as far as comparing her 2012 squad to the Bears' 2002 national championship team. California started the season as #3 in the NFCA poll and spent most of the first half of the season as #1 in the ESPN poll and #2 in the NFCA poll. Heading into conference play, the Golden Bears had compiled a record of 26–1 with their only loss coming at the hands of then #18 Hawai'i in extra innings in Honolulu after previously beating then-#6 Texas in a hard fought game. To start off the conference slate, then-#2 California traveled across the bay to face then-#9 Stanford in a 3-game series in Palo Alto, and the Bears promptly swept the Cardinal to earn the #1 spot in both polls for the first time during the 2012 campaign. After the three game sweep of Stanford, the #1 Bears did not slow down, sweeping then-#3 Washington in Berkeley and unranked Utah in Salt Lake City. After the Washington series, the Bears were the unanimous #1 team in the country according to the NFCA and ESPN polls and at this same time, California came in as #1 in the NCAA's RPI rankings. The Bears would go on to face then-#13 Arizona and despite losing their first conference game to the Wildcats, they still won the series 2–1 and retained the #1 ranking in both the NFCA and ESPN polls. The following weekend, the Bears travelled to Eugene to take on the then-18th ranked Ducks, and again took two of three games and retained the #1 spot in both polls for a fifth consecutive week. On April 24, 2012, California was in first place in the Pac-12 Conference with Arizona State only one game behind the top ranked Bears. In the second-to-last conference series of the regular season, both the Sun Devils and Bears swept their opponents (Utah and Oregon State respectively) setting up a showdown in Berkeley for the conference championship. Going into the final weekend series of the regular season, the Golden Bears sported a 19–2 record in conference play and needed to take 2 of 3 from second place (and #2 in the national polls) Arizona State. The Bears won the first game of the series thanks to walk off two-run home run by senior Valerie Arioto and won the second game of the series by a final score of 5-0 therefore winning the inaugural Pac-12 championship. The 2012 conference championship was the Bears' first sole conference championship since 1987 (they shared a title in 2005), which just happened to be the first Pac-10 conference championship that was awarded. Because California won their conference, they received an automatic bid to the NCAA tournament, was later awarded the #1 overall seed in the tournament, and because of the upgrades at Levine-Fricke Field, the Bears will host games in Berkeley for the first time since 1993.

Attendance statistics
In 2012, California broke all attendance records for the softball program partially because on April 11, 2012, the University of California athletic department announced that they had more than doubled the capacity of Levine-Fricke Field by adding 704 bleacher seats in the outfield. On April 29, 2012, the California softball program broke the previous attendance record of 969 in a game against the UCLA Bruins with an announced crowd of 1,069, California then, however, broke the record again later on in the season with a crowd of 1,135 for the final game of the regular season. Overall, the Bears drew a crowd over 1,000 three times during the season for the first time in the program's history.

Capacity: 500 (Feb.-Apr. 10), 1,204 (Apr. 11-)
Average attendance: 529 (56.3% capacity)
Total attendance: 7,939 (15 games)

Postseason
On May 13, 2012, it was announced that the Golden Bears would receive the #1 overall seed in the 2012 NCAA softball tournament and will host a regional at Levine-Fricke Field in Berkeley. Also, if the Bears advance to the Super Regionals, they will also host that series in Berkeley. In the past, Levine-Fricke Field has not been able to host tournament games because it was considered inadequate by NCAA standards, however, the University of California athletic department was able to add approximately 704 bleacher seats in the outfield to bring capacity well above the minimum of 500 in February 2012 and will rent temporary light and build a temporary press box in order to play night games and accommodate television crews.

Berkeley Regional and Super Regional
The Bears opened up the tournament in Berkeley against the Iona Gaels on Friday, May 18, 2012. The regional will run from Friday, May 18 through Sunday, May 20 and will be a double-elimination tournament featuring #1 seeded California, Iona, Arkansas, and Boston University. The Bears won the first game of the Berkeley Regional by defeating the Iona Gaels 8–0 in 5 innings but then were shocked by Arkansas on day two of the regional losing 3-2 to the Razorbacks. California bounced back by defeating Boston University in 6 innings by a final score of 8–0 and promptly beat Arkansas 10–2 and 7–0 on Sunday to advance to the Super Regional round that will also be played at Levine-Fricke Field. The Bears defeated the #16 seed Washington Huskies in the Berkeley Super Regional in two straight games on May 26 and 27. After sweeping the Berkeley Super Regional, California earned a berth to the Women's College World Series for the 12th time in program history.

Women's College World Series
On May 27, 2012 the #1 seeded California Golden Bears clinched the program's 12th Women's College World Series berth by defeating the Washington Huskies in the Berkeley Super Regional. The Bears' first opponent in the world series will be LSU on Thursday May 30.

Game logs

Regular season

|-  style="text-align:center; background:#bfb;"
| 1 || February 10 || vs. #9 Tennessee || 13–5 || #3 ||  J. Henderson (1–0) || I. Renfroe (0–1) || || 408 || 1–0 (0–0) || Farrington Stadium || W1
|-  style="text-align:center; background:#bfb;"
| 2 || February 11 || vs. Bradley || 5–0 || #3 ||  V. Arioto (1–0) || M. Lynch-Crumri (1–1) || || 185 || 2–0 (0–0) || Farrington Stadium || W2
|-  style="text-align:center; background:#bfb;"
| 3 || February 11 || vs. Texas State || 10–0 (5) || #3 ||  J. Henderson (2–0) || C. Hall (0–1) || || 220 || 3–0 (0–0) || Farrington Stadium || W3
|-  style="text-align:center; background:#bfb;"
| 4 || February 12 || vs. Syracuse || 6–3 || #3 ||  J. Henderson (3–0) || J. Caira (2–1) || || 96 || 4–0 (0–0) || Farrington Stadium || W4
|-  style="text-align:center; background:#bfb;"
| 5 || February 17 || vs. DePaul || 2–0 || #1 ||  V. Arioto (2–0) || H. Penna (0–1) || || || 5–0 (0–0) || Eller Media Stadium || W5
|-  style="text-align:center; background:#bfb;"
| 6 || February 18 || vs. San Jose State || 7–0 || #1 ||  J. Henderson (4–0) || A. Pridmore (0–1) || || 120 || 6–0 (0–0) || SLC Park || W6
|-  style="text-align:center; background:#bfb;"
| 7 || February 18 || vs. UC Riverside || 10–0 (5) || #1 ||  V. Arioto (3–0) || J. McDonald (0–1) || || || 7–0 (0–0) || SLC Park || W7
|-  style="text-align:center; background:#bfb;"
| 8 || February 19 || vs. LSU || 14–3 (5) || #1 ||  J. Henderson (5–0) || B. Mack (1–3) || || || 8–0 (0–0) || Stephanie Craig Park || W8
|-  style="text-align:center; background:#bfb;"
| 9 || February 24 || vs. Fordham || 5–0 || #1 ||  V. Arioto (4–0) || J. Mineau (0–1) || || 125 || 9–0 (0–0) || Big League Dreams || W9
|-  style="text-align:center; background:#bfb;"
| 10 || February 25 || vs. New Mexico St. || 2–0 || #1 ||  J. Henderson (6–0) || A. Newman (0–1) || || 120 || 10–0 (0–0) || Big League Dreams || W10
|-  style="text-align:center; background:#bfb;"
| 11 || February 25 || vs. Cal Poly || 4–1 || #1 ||  V. Arioto (5–0) || R. Patton (0–1) || || 120 || 11–0 (0–0) || Big League Dreams || W11
|-  style="text-align:center; background:#bfb;"
| 12 || February 26 || vs. Cal St. Northridge || 7–0 || #1 ||  J. Henderson (7–0) || M. Pagano (0–1) || || 130 || 12–0 (0–0) || Big League Dreams|| W12
|-  style="text-align:center; background:#bbb;"
|  || February 29 || Pacific ||  || #1 || colspan=4 | Cancelled (rain) || 12–0 (0–0) || Levine-Fricke Field || 
|- 

|-  style="text-align:center; background:#bfb;"
| 13 || March 2 || vs. FIU || 8–1 || #1 || V. Arioto (6–0) || M. Dawson (5–3) || ||  || 13–0 (0–0) || Anderson Family Field || W13
|-  style="text-align:center; background:#bfb;"
| 14 || March 2 || vs. Southern Miss || 8–0 (5) || #1 || J. Henderson (8–0) || G. Luciani (2–1) || || || 14–0 (0–0) || Anderson Family Field || W14
|-  style="text-align:center; background:#bfb;"
| 15 || March 3 || vs. East Carolina || 11–3 (5) || #1 || V. Arioto (7–0) || C. Smith (2–0) || || 287 || 15–0 (0–0) || Anderson Family Field || W15
|-  style="text-align:center; background:#bfb;"
| 16 || March 3 || vs. Northwestern || 5–1 || #1 || J. Henderson (9–0) || M. Lamberth (2–4) || || || 16–0 (0–0) || Anderson Family Field || W16
|-  style="text-align:center; background:#bfb;"
| 17 || March 7 || UC Davis || 11–3 (6) || #1 || J. Henderson (10–0) || J. Thweatt (2–7) || || 137 || 17–0 (0–0) || Levine-Fricke Field || W17
|-  style="text-align:center; background:#bfb;"
| 18 || March 10 || vs. San Diego State || 12–0 (5) || #1 || J. Henderson (11–0) || R. Arbino (7–5) || || || 18–0 (0–0) || Bulldog Diamond || W18
|-  style="text-align:center; background:#bfb;"
| 19 || March 10 || vs. Butler || 14–1 (5) || #1 || V. Arioto (8–0) || B. Fisher (1–3) || || 1,250 || 19–0 (0–0) || Bulldog Diamond || W19
|-  style="text-align:center; background:#bfb;"
| 20 || March 11 || vs. Purdue || 9–1 (6) || #1 || J. Henderson (12–0) || A. Whittemore (2–2) || || 250 || 20–0 (0–0) || Bulldog Diamond || W20
|-  style="text-align:center; background:#bfb;"
| 21 || March 11 || @ Fresno State || 8–5 || #1 ||  V. Arioto (9–0) || M. Moses (8–7) || || || 21–0 (0–0) || Bulldog Diamond || W21
|-  style="text-align:center; background:#bfb;"
| 22 || March 14 || vs. #21 Texas A&M || 3–0 || #1 || J. Henderson (13–0) || M. Dumezich (11–5) || || || 22–0 (0–0) || Rainbow Wahine Stadium || W22
|-  style="text-align:center; background:#bfb;"
| 23 || March 15 || vs. #6 Texas || 6–3 || #1 || V. Arioto (10–0) || B. Luna (9–1) || J. Henderson (1) || || 23–0 (0–0) || Rainbow Wahine Stadium || W23
|-  style="text-align:center; background:#fbb;"
| 24 || March 15 || @ #19 Hawai'i || 3–1 (10) || #1 || S. Ricketts (13–1) || J. Henderson (13–1) || || 1,200 || 23–1 (0–0) || Rainbow Wahine Stadium || L1
|-  style="text-align:center; background:#bfb;"
| 25 || March 16 || vs. Marist || 1–0 || #1 || V. Arioto (11–0) || M. White (1–5) || J. Henderson (2) || || 24–1 (0–0) || Rainbow Wahine Stadium || W1
|-  style="text-align:center; background:#bfb;"
| 26 || March 17 || vs. Winthrop || 7–1 || #1 || J. Henderson (14–1) || N. Becker (5–7) || || || 25–1 (0–0) || Rainbow Wahine Stadium || W2
|-  style="text-align:center; background:#bfb;"
| 27 || March 20 || Princeton || 8–0 (5) || #2 || V. Arioto (12–0) || L. Kuhn (1–3) || || 250|| 26–1 (0–0) || Levine-Fricke Field || W3
|-  style="text-align:center; background:#bfb;"
| 28 || March 23 || @ #9 Stanford || 9–0 || #2 || J. Henderson (15–1) || T. Gerhart (20–2) || || 857 || 27–1 (1–0) || Smith Family Stadium || W4
|-  style="text-align:center; background:#bbb;"
|  || March 24 || @ #9 Stanford ||  || #2 || colspan=4 | Postponed (rain); Rescheduled for March 25 || 27–1 (1–0) || Smith Family Stadium || 
|-  style="text-align:center; background:#bfb;"
| 29 || March 25 || @ #9 Stanford || 4–3 || #2 || V. Arioto (13–0) || N. White (5–3) || J. Henderson (3) || 462 || 28–1 (2–0) || Smith Family Stadium || W5
|-  style="text-align:center; background:#bfb;"
| 30 || March 25 || @ #9 Stanford || 8–0 || #2 || J. Henderson (16–1) || T. Gerhart (20–3) || || 389 || 29–1 (3–0) || Smith Family Stadium || W6
|-  style="text-align:center; background:#bfb;"
| 31 || March 28 || Sacramento State || 8–0 (5) || #1 || V. Arioto (14–0) || S. Voelz (4–2) || || 93 || 30–1 (3–0) || Levine-Fricke Field || W7
|-  style="text-align:center; background:#bfb;"
| 32 || March 30 || #3 Washington || 2–1 || #1 || J. Henderson (17–1) || K. Inglesby (16–1) || || 240 || 31–1 (4–0) || Levine-Fricke Field || W8
|-  style="text-align:center; background:#bbb;"
|  || March 31 || #3 Washington ||  || #1 || colspan=4 | Postponed (rain); Rescheduled for April 1 || 31–1 (4–0) || Levine-Fricke Field ||
|- 

|-  style="text-align:center; background:#bfb;"
| 33 || April 1 || #3 Washington || 5–3 || #1 || V. Arioto (15–0) || K. Stanchek (9–1) || || || 32–1 (5–0) || Levine-Fricke Field || W9
|-  style="text-align:center; background:#bfb;"
| 34 || April 1 || #3 Washington || 6–4 || #1 || J. Henderson (18–1) || K. Inglesby (16–2) || || 680 || 33–1 (6–0) || Levine-Fricke Field || W10
|-  style="text-align:center; background:#bfb;"
| 35 || April 5 || @ Utah || 10–0 (5) || #1 || J. Henderson (19–1) || M. Ramírez (2–1) || || 203 || 34–1 (7–0) || Ute Softball Field || W11
|-  style="text-align:center; background:#bbb;"
|  || April 6 || @ Utah ||  || #1 || colspan=4 | Postponed (snow); Rescheduled for April 7 || 34–1 (7–0) || Ute Softball Field ||
|-  style="text-align:center; background:#bfb;"
| 36 || April 7 || @ Utah || 11–3 (5) || #1 || V. Arioto (16–0) || G. Nielson (17–8) || || 389 || 35–1 (8–0) || Ute Softball Field || W12
|-  style="text-align:center; background:#bfb;"
| 37 || April 7 || @ Utah || 12–3 (6) || #1 || J. Henderson (20–1) || G. Nielson (17–9) || || 503 || 36–1 (9–0) || Ute Softball Field || W13
|-  style="text-align:center; background:#bfb;"
| 38 || April 11 || @ Saint Mary's || 9–0 || #1 || V. Arioto (17–0) || J. Lemmon (8–9) || || 220 || 37–1 (9–0) || Cottrell Field || W14
|-  style="text-align:center; background:#bfb;"
| 39 || April 13 || #13 Arizona || 2–0 || #1 || J. Henderson (21–1) || K. Fowler (12–4) || || 415 || 38–1 (10–0) || Levine-Fricke Field || W15
|-  style="text-align:center; background:#fbb;"
| 40 || April 14 || #13 Arizona || 8–3 || #1 || S. Babcock (15–7) || V. Arioto (17–1) || || 664 || 38–2 (10–1) || Levine-Fricke Field || L1
|-  style="text-align:center; background:#bfb;"
| 41 || April 15 || #13 Arizona || 6–0 || #1 || J. Henderson (22–1) || K. Fowler (12–5) || || 517 || 39–2 (11–1) || Levine-Fricke Field || W1
|-  style="text-align:center; background:#bfb;"
| 42 || April 18 || Santa Clara || 10–2 (5) || #1 || V. Arioto (18–1) || J. Turner (2–9) || || 113 || 40–2 (11–1) || Levine-Fricke Field || W2
|-  style="text-align:center; background:#bfb;"
| 43 || April 20 || @ #14 Oregon || 8–1 || #1 || J. Henderson (23–1) || J. Moore (21–7) || || 457 || 41–2 (12–1) || Howe Field || W3
|-  style="text-align:center; background:#fbb;"
| 44 || April 21 || @ #14 Oregon || 1–0 || #1 || J. Moore (22–7) || V. Arioto (18–2) || || 475 || 41–3 (12–2) || Howe Field || L1
|-  style="text-align:center; background:#bfb;"
| 45 || April 22 || @ #14 Oregon || 10–0 (6) || #1 || J. Henderson (24–1) || J. Moore (22–8) || || 633 || 42–3 (13–2) || Howe Field || W1
|-  style="text-align:center; background:#bfb;"
| 46 || April 27 || #14 UCLA || 3–0 || #1 || J. Henderson (25–1) || J. Hall (16–8) || || 353 || 43–3 (14–2) || Levine-Fricke Field || W2
|-  style="text-align:center; background:#bfb;"
| 47 || April 28 || #14 UCLA || 8–0 (6) || #1 || V. Arioto (19–2) || J. Hall (16–9) || J. Henderson (4) || 841 || 44–3 (15–2) || Levine-Fricke Field || W3
|-  style="text-align:center; background:#bfb;"
| 48 || April 29 || #14 UCLA || 10–3 || #1 || J. Henderson (26–1) || J. Hall (16–10) || || 1,069 || 45–3 (16–2) || Levine-Fricke Field || W4
|- 

|-  style="text-align:center; background:#bfb;"
| 49 || May 4 || @ #22 Oregon State || 9–1 (5) || #1 || J. Henderson (27–1) || T. Andreana (9–10) || || 333 || 46–3 (17–2) || OSU Softball Complex || W5
|-  style="text-align:center; background:#bfb;"
| 50 || May 5 || @ #22 Oregon State || 4–2 || #1 || J. Henderson (28–1) || M. Demore (7–5) || || 421 || 47–3 (18–2) || OSU Softball Complex || W6
|-  style="text-align:center; background:#bfb;"
| 51 || May 6 || @ #22 Oregon State || 4–1 || #1 || J. Henderson (29–1) || P. Hall (4–3) || || 697 || 48–3 (19–2) || OSU Softball Complex || W7
|-  style="text-align:center; background:#bfb;"
| 52 || May 10 || #2 Arizona State || 4–2 || #1 || J. Henderson (30–1) || M. Popescue (7–2) || || 407 || 49–3 (20–2) || Levine-Fricke Field || W8
|-  style="text-align:center; background:#bfb;"
| 53 || May 11* || #2 Arizona State || 5–0 || #1 || V. Arioto (20–2) || H. Bach (19–1) || || 1,025 || 50–3 (21–2) || Levine-Fricke Field || W9
|-  style="text-align:center; background:#fbb;"
| 54 || May 12 || #2 Arizona State || 5–0 || #1 || D. Escobedo (20–4) || J. Henderson (30–2) || || 1,135** || 50–4 (21–3) || Levine-Fricke Field || L1
|-
| colspan=12 | *California clinched the 2012 Pac-12 Conference Championship on May 11, 2012 after defeating #2 Arizona State 5–0.**All-time single game attendance record at Levine-Fricke Field.
|-

Postseason

|-  style="text-align:center; background:#bfb;"
| 1 || May 18 || Iona || 8–0 (5) || #1 || J. Henderson (31–2) || S. Jackson (17–13) || || 1,059 || 1–0 || Levine-Fricke Field || W1
|-  style="text-align:center; background:#fbb;"
| 2 || May 19 || Arkansas || 3–2 || #1 || K. Beasley (11–9) || V. Arioto (20–3) || C. Cohen (2) || — || 1–1 || Levine-Fricke Field || L1
|-  style="text-align:center; background:#bfb;"
| 3 || May 19 || Boston University || 8–0 (6) || #1 || J. Henderson (32–2) || W. Tuthill (14–6) ||  || 1,064 || 2–1 || Levine-Fricke Field || W2
|-  style="text-align:center; background:#bfb;"
| 4 || May 20 || Arkansas || 10–2 (5) || #1 || J. Henderson (33–2) || H. McLemore (2–1) ||  || — || 3–1 || Levine-Fricke Field || W3
|-  style="text-align:center; background:#bfb;"
| 5 || May 20 || Arkansas || 7–0 || #1 || J. Henderson (34–2) || K. Beasley (11–10) || || 1,028 || 4–1 || Levine-Fricke Field || W4
|- 

|-  style="text-align:center; background:#bfb;"
| 1 || May 26 || #18 Washington (16) || 5–0 || #1 || J. Henderson (35–2) || K. Inglesby (19–11) ||  || 1,117 || 1–0 || Levine-Fricke Field || W1
|-  style="text-align:center; background:#bfb;"
| 2 || May 27 || #18 Washington (16) || 2–0 || #1 || J. Henderson (35–2) || B. Walker(10–6) ||  || 1,125 || 2–0 || Levine-Fricke Field || W2
|-

|- style="text-align:center;"
| 1 || May 26 || LSU ||  || #1 || colspan=5 | Time: 12:30p PDT • Television: ESPN2 || Hall of Fame Stadium || 
|- style="text-align:center;"
| 2 || TBD || TBD ||  || #1 || colspan=5 | Time: TBD PDT • Television: ESPN2 || Hall of Fame Stadium ||
|-

Rankings and standings

2012 ranking movement

2012 Pac-12 Conference standings

*Automatically qualified for the postseason by virtue of winning the Pac-12 Conference championship.
**Received an at-large berth to the 2012 NCAA softball tournament.

See also
California Golden Bears
California Golden Bears softball
Levine-Fricke Field
2012 NCAA Division I softball tournament
2011 California Golden Bears football team
2011–12 California Golden Bears men's basketball team
2012 California Golden Bears baseball team

References

California Golden Bears softball seasons
California Golden Bears
2012 NCAA Division I softball tournament participants
Women's College World Series seasons
Golden Bear